Sigalens is a commune in the Gironde department in Nouvelle-Aquitaine in southwestern France. As of 2019 it has a population of 362.

Population

See also
Communes of the Gironde department

References

Communes of Gironde